The United Mexican States and the Republic of Singapore have had diplomatic and other bilateral relations since 1975. Both nations are members of the Asia-Pacific Economic Cooperation and the United Nations.

History 

Mexico recognized and established diplomatic relations with Singapore on 22 December 1975. In 1990, Mexico opened a resident embassy in Singapore. Singapore has since operated a non-resident embassy based in Singapore and maintains an honorary consulate-general based in Mexico City.

Since the establishment of diplomatic relations; the relations between the two countries has developed continuously based on common international positions and companionship. In 1990, President Carlos Salinas de Gortari became the first Mexican head-of-state to visit Singapore. In 1991, Senior Minister Lee Kuan Yew paid an official visit to Mexico. Since the initial visits, there have been several high-level visits between leaders of both nations.

In September 2012, Mexican President Felipe Calderón, visited Singapore and met with President Tony Tan, and Prime Minister Lee Hsien Loong. President Calderón delivered a speech in The Fullerton Hotel Singapore titled "A Mexican Perspective on the Global Economy" for the International Institute for Strategic Studies.

In October 2013, Mexican Foreign Minister José Antonio Meade visited Singapore and met with Minister of Finance Tharman Shanmugaratnam and Foreign Minister K. Shanmugam. In 2014, K. Shanmugam visited Mexico and met with Jose Antonio Meade. He also attended a Business Breakfast Roundtable organized by ProMéxico and addressed a speech called "Bridging the Pacific: The Singapore-Mexico Partnership" with diplomats, business leaders and private sector personalities attending the Roundtable.

In June 2016, Singaporean President Tony Tan paid an official visit to Mexico and met with Mexican President Enrique Peña Nieto. His arrival to Mexico coincided with the 40th anniversary of diplomatic relations between the two nations. During President Tan's four day visit to Mexico, both nations signed agreements on trade and improved cooperation in science and education as well as the promotion of the Trans-Pacific Partnership Agreement (TPP).

In November 2019, Prime Minister Lee Hsien Loong paid a visit to Mexico and met with Mexican President Andrés Manuel López Obrador. During the visit, President López Obrador announced that Singapore would partake in the development of the Isthmus of Tehuantepec in southern Mexico.

High-level visits
High-level visits from Mexico to Singapore
 President Carlos Salinas de Gortari (1990)
 President Ernesto Zedillo (1996, 2000)
 President Felipe Calderón (2009, 2012)
 Foreign Minister José Antonio Meade (2013)
 Foreign Undersecretary Carmen Moreno Toscano (2022)

High-level visits from Singapore to Mexico
 Senior Minister Lee Kuan Yew (1991)
 Prime Minister Goh Chok Tong (1997)
 Foreign Minister K. Shanmugam (2014)
 President Tony Tan (2016)
 Prime Minister Lee Hsien Loong (2019)

Bilateral agreements
Both nations have signed several bilateral agreements, such as an Agreement on Air Services (1991); Agreement on the Avoidance of Double-Taxation and Tax Evasion (1995); Agreement on the Promotion and Reciprocal Protection of Investments (2011); Memorandum of Understanding in Cultural and Artistic Cooperation (2013); Memorandum of Understanding of Touristic Cooperation (2013); Agreement in Educational Cooperation (2014) and a Memorandum of Understanding in Agricultural, Educational and Economic Cooperation.

Trade relations 
In 2018, trade between Mexico and Singapore totaled US$2.8 billion. Mexico main exports to Singapore include: oil; memory units; process units; digital process units; control units or adapters; and sugar. Singapore's main exports to Mexico include: gasoline; memory units; modular circuits; mounted piezoelectric crystals; non-volatile storage devices, and semiconductors. In 2013, Keppel Corporation of Singapore signed an agreement with Pemex of Mexico to develop oil fields in the Gulf of Mexico. The agreements were witnessed by the foreign ministers of both countries.

Resident diplomatic missions 
 Mexico has an embassy in Singapore.
 Singapore maintains a non-resident ambassador accredited to Mexico based in Singapore and maintains an honorary consulate-general in Mexico City.

References 

 
Singapore
Bilateral relations of Singapore